State Road 417 (NM 417) is a  state highway in the US state of New Mexico. NM 417's western terminus is at NM 402 north of Nara Visa, and the eastern terminus is a continuation as Ranch to Market Road 3296 (RM 3296) at the Texas/ New Mexico border north-northeast of Nara Visa.

Major intersections

See also

References

417
Transportation in Union County, New Mexico